Berita Harian (Malay for "Daily News") is the sole Malay-language broadsheet newspaper published in Singapore. It is published daily from Monday to Saturday and on Sunday as Berita Minggu (Malay: "Sunday News"). It was founded on 1 July 1957. The newspaper was revamped in May 2013.

It had an average daily circulation of 52,500 in 2012.

In December 2013, Berita Harian relaunched their website, replacing the previous cyberita.asia1.com.sg.

This newspaper is not related to another newspaper of the same name, Berita Harian, which is based and published in Malaysia although both newspapers were established on the same date, 1 July 1957.

See also 
 Suria
 Ria 89.7FM
 Warna 94.2FM

External links
  Berita Harian Singapore
  

1957 establishments in Singapore
Malay-language newspapers
Malays in Singapore
Newspapers published in Singapore
SPH Media Trust
Publications established in 1957